The Sevilla Tower, known until 2015 as the Pelli Tower, is an office skyscraper in Seville, Spain. Its construction started in March 2008 and was completed in 2015. It is an office building, with the entrance to the tower located off Odiel street. The tower is the tallest building in Andalusia and in the city of Seville, and the seventh tallest in Spain. It provides a panoramic view on all Seville.

The tower is located in La Cartuja, the former zone of the Universal Exposition that took place in Seville between April and October 1992.  It is located next to the river in an area being redeveloped since the early 2000s. The tower is flanked by two four story podium buildings also designed by César Pelli. The curved edges of the podium buildings define a plaza that opens on the north and south and narrows at the center, creating a pedestrian-scaled commercial street.

The tower notably hosts a 5-star hotel, Eurostars Torre Sevilla, along with various offices.

Controversy

It had been reported that UNESCO was considering putting the Seville's monuments which are classified as World Heritage Sites (the Cathedral, Alcazar and Archivo de Indias) into the "Threatened List", because of the tower's "negative visual impact" on the old town skyline of Seville. UNESCO went so far as to ask the city to reduce the tower's height, but city officials ignored the requests. The proposal was rejected at the meeting of the UNESCO World Heritage Committee in Saint Petersburg in 2012 but the meeting regretted that work on the tower had not been suspended, as requested by the Committee at its previous session, and that no discussions or consultations had been undertaken to consider how the project could be improved and any possible impact further reduced.

References

External links 

 Sevillasemueve
 Sevilla21.com
 Factoría Urbana
 Ayuntamiento de Sevilla

Skyscrapers in Spain
Buildings and structures in Seville
César Pelli buildings
Buildings and structures completed in 2015
Skyscraper office buildings in Spain